The Vengeance of Pancho Villa ( or ) is a 1967 Spanish Western film directed by José María Elorrieta, scored by Federico Contreras and starred by John Ericson, Nuria Torray and Gustavo Rojo.

Cast 
 Nuria Torray as María
 John Ericson as Don Diego Alvarado/Diego Owens
 Mara Cruz as Vera Stevens
 Gustavo Rojo as General Urbina
 Juan Antonio Peral as Juárez
 Fernando Curiel as Chaves
 Reginal Guilliams as Salas
 Guillermo Méndez as Camacho
 José Luis Lluch as Mudo
 Regina de Julián as Juana
 Rosa Girón as Rosita
 Mario Losier
 Beatriz Savón as a Cantina Girl
 Pastor Serrador as Manuel Sierra
 Antonio Jiménez Escribano as Colonel Hidalgo
 James Philbrook as Sheriff of Cerezo
 Ricardo Palacios as Pancho Villa

References

External links

1967 films
American Western (genre) films
1960s Spanish-language films
Mexican Revolution films
Films about Pancho Villa
Films produced by Sidney W. Pink
Films directed by José María Elorrieta
1967 Western (genre) films
Spanish Western (genre) films
1960s American films
1960s Spanish films